Bolón may refer to:

 Peruvian plantain disch tacacho, known in Ecuador as bolón de verde 
 Mountain in Elda, Alicante, Spain
 Urban district in Umán Municipality, Mexico
 Waterfall in Chiapas

See also
 Bolon (disambiguation)